Vignysa is a genus of annelids belonging to the family Hormogastridae.

The species of this genus are found in Europe.

Species:

Vignysa popi 
Vignysa teres
Vignysa vedovinii

References

Annelids